Euthima rodens is a species of beetle in the family Cerambycidae. It was described by Henry Walter Bates in 1865. It is known from Peru, French Guiana, Brazil, Ecuador and Bolivia.

References

Onciderini
Beetles described in 1865